PTL may refer to:
 The PTL Club, a former television program
 PTL Satellite Network
 Pass transistor logic in digital electronic circuits
 Pittsburgh Today Live, program on KDKA-TV
 Propositional temporal logic (Linear temporal logic)
 "PTL", a song by Relient K from the album Collapsible Lung
 Paschall Truck Lines